Dumbrăvești is a commune in Prahova County, Muntenia, Romania. It is composed of six villages: Dumbrăvești, Găvănel, Mălăeștii de Jos, Mălăeștii de Sus, Plopeni and Sfârleanca.

References

Communes in Prahova County
Localities in Muntenia